William Joseph Adams (February 4, 1950) was a former American football offensive guard in the National Football League. He played for the Buffalo Bills.  He played college football at the College of the Holy Cross in Worcester, Massachusetts.

He was the head football coach for the Lynnfield High School Pioneers in Lynnfield, Massachusetts. He taught Physical Education and Health for many years until his retirement after the 2009-2010 school year. He will remain Co-Athletic Director with Neil Weidman, the new head football coach. He is currently a substitute teacher and ISS supervisor at Georgetown High School in Georgetown, MA.

References

1950 births
Living people
American football offensive guards
Buffalo Bills players
Holy Cross Crusaders football players
High school football coaches in Massachusetts
Sportspeople from Lynn, Massachusetts